Bangladesh National Film Award for Best Supporting Actress is the highest award for film actresses in a supporting role in Bangladesh.

List of winners
Key

Records and statistics

Multiple wins and nominations
The following individuals received two or more actress in a supporting role   awards:

See also
 Bangladesh National Film Award for Best Supporting Actor
 Bangladesh National Film Award for Best Actor
 Bangladesh National Film Award for Best Actress

Notes

References

Sources

 
 
 
 
 
 

Supporting Actress
National Film Awards (Bangladesh)